Stefan Hüfner (July 2, 1935 in Löwenberg, Silesia – January 17, 2013 in Saarbrücken, Saarland) was a German experimental physicist specialized in solid-state physics and photoemission spectroscopy.

Education and career 
Hüfner studied mathematics and physics at the Goethe University of Frankfurt and the Technical University of Darmstadt. After graduating from 1960 to 1966, he was a scientific assistant at the Institute for Technical Physics at the TU Darmstadt. In 1963 he received his doctorate there, supervised by Karl-Heinz Hellwege. In 1966 he obtained habilitation in physics. He was a guest researcher at the Technical University of Munich and at the Bell Telephone Laboratories in Murray Hill, N.Y., USA. From 1967 to 1968 he was a privatdozent at the TU Darmstadt and the doctoral supervisor of Peter Grünberg, who was awarded the Nobel Prize in Physics in 2007.

In 1968 he received a call to the professorship for experimental physics at the Free University of Berlin as the successor to Professor Gerhard Simonsohn. In 1975, Hüfner moved to the professorship for experimental physics at Saarland University. In 1994 he became founding speaker of the Collaborative Research Center "Interface-determined Materials". In 2001 he took over the office of university vice president for planning and strategy, which he held until the beginning of 2003. In September 2003 he retired.

Honors and awards 

Hüfner was an emeritus member of the advisory board of the Max Planck Institute for Nuclear Physics in Heidelberg, the Max Planck Institute for Physics in Munich, the Max Planck Institute for Plasma Physics in Greifswald and Munich and the Max Planck Institute for Quantum Optics in Munich and other advisory boards of the Max Planck Society. Since 2004 he has been a member and chairman of the Technical Committee for Engineering Sciences of the Elite Network of Bavaria. In 2006/2007 he was a visiting professor at the University of British Columbia in Vancouver, Canada.

He received honorary doctorates from the University of Fribourg and the Free University of Berlin.

Works 
Hüfner authored the classic textbook on photoemission spectroscopy, first published in 1995 and has gone through three editions in total.

In addition to numerous scientific publications, Hüfner has also written several novels, including Der Tote von Dresden (Conte Verlag 2004, ISBN 978-3-936950-49-6) and Artikel eins. Ein Zukunftsroman (Conte Verlag 2006, ISBN 978-3-936950-41-0).

Bibliography

Textbooks and monographs

Fictions

Reviews

See also 
 Jürgen Kirschner

References

External links 
 
 Universität des Saarlandes: „Neuer Vizepräsident: Stefan Hüfner“, Januar 2001

2013 deaths
1935 births
Academic staff of Saarland University
Academic staff of the Free University of Berlin
20th-century physicists
German physicists
German materials scientists
Experimental physicists
Condensed matter physicists
Scientists at Bell Labs
Goethe University Frankfurt alumni
Technische Universität Darmstadt alumni
Academic staff of Technische Universität Darmstadt
People from Lwówek Śląski